Robert W. Brownson (December 19, 1922 – October 17, 1975) was an American football and basketball coach. He served as the head football coach at Ashland College—now known as Ashland University—in Ashland, Ohio from 1954 to 1957, compiling a record of 21–10–1. Brownson was also the head basketball coach at Ashland from 1954 to 1958, tallying a mark of 28–45. He was the athletic director at Ashland from 1959 to 1971.

Brownson died on at the age of 52, on October 17, 1975, at the Cleveland Clinic in Cleveland, Ohio.

Head coaching record

College football

References

1922 births
1975 deaths
Ashland Eagles athletic directors
Ashland Eagles football coaches
Ashland Eagles football players
Ashland Eagles men's basketball coaches
Basketball coaches from Ohio
High school basketball coaches in Ohio
High school football coaches in Ohio
People from Ashland, Ohio
Players of American football from Ohio